Dorze may refer to:
the Dorze people
the Dorze language